This is a list of members of the South Australian House of Assembly from 2018 to 2022, as elected at the 2018 state election and subsequent by-elections.

See also
 Members of the South Australian Legislative Council, 2018–2022

References

Members of South Australian parliaments by term
21st-century Australian politicians